Platacmaea cretiseca is a moth in the  family Lyonetiidae. It is known from Kenya.

References

Endemic moths of Kenya
Lyonetiidae
Moths of Africa
Moths described in 1920